The 2018–19 SuperLiga (also known as the CEC Bank SuperLiga for sponsorship reasons) is the 105th season of premier club rugby in Romania. Starting with this edition the number of participating teams is increased to eight, with addition of the 2017–18 champions and runners-up of the second tier championship DNS - Divizia Nationala de Seniori. The eventual champions of the SuperLiga which are CSM Știința Baia Mare have the right to participate in the European Rugby Continental Shield and no team will relegate to the Divizia Națională de Seniori, Romiania's 2nd level rugby union competition as CS Năvodari didn't apply to play in the SuperLiga next season.

Teams

Table
This is the regular season league table:

Fixtures & Results

Round 1

Round 2

Round 3

Round 4

Round 5

Round 6

Round 7

Round 8

Round 9

Round 10

Round 11

Round 12

Round 13

Round 14

Play-off Semifinals
The semi-finals were held on 18 May 2019 12:00 and 14:30 at Stadionul Olimpia and Stadionul Dan Păltinișanu respectively.

 Third place final
Both finals were held on 25 May 2019, 1 week after the semi-finals at Stadionul Rulmental.

 First place final

Play-out Semifinals
The semi-finals were held on 18 May 2019 09:00 at Stadionul Mihai Naca and Stadionul Prințul Șerban Ghica respectively.

 Seventh place final
Both finals were held on 26 May 2019, 1 week and 1 day after the semi-finals at Stadionul Olimpia.

 Fifth place final

External links
  www.super-liga.ro  – Official website

References 

SuperLiga (rugby)
2018–19 in European rugby union leagues
2018–19 in Romanian rugby union